Dayananda Sahabandu (born 28 March 1940) is a former cricketer who played first-class cricket for Sri Lanka from 1968 to 1975. In September 2018, he was one of 49 former Sri Lankan cricketers felicitated by Sri Lanka Cricket, to honour them for their services before Sri Lanka became a full member of the International Cricket Council (ICC).

Cricket career
Daya Sahabandu attended Royal College, Colombo, where he played in the First XI from 1957 to 1960. A left-arm spin bowler who could also bowl a little faster and open the bowling, he began playing senior club cricket in Ceylon in the early 1960s, and in 20 seasons, mostly playing for Nomads Sports Club, he took more than 1000 wickets with his left-arm spin at an average of just over 14. He was selected to tour England with the Ceylon team in 1968, but the tour was cancelled just before it was due to begin.

After the English veteran Test player Tom Graveney was dismissed by Sahabandu in the 1968-69 season, he said Sahabandu was the best left-arm spinner he had ever faced. Two months later, in a drawn Gopalan Trophy match, Sahabandu opened the bowling for Ceylon and took 5 for 54 and 6 for 83.

On Sri Lanka's tour of India in 1975-76 he took 8 for 37 and 4 for 46 against East Zone. He was occasionally a useful defensive tail-end batsman, but was a poor fielder.

He later served as a national selector.

Work and family
Sahabandu was employed for 14 years as a physical education instructor by the Colombo Municipal Council and then for 30 years as an executive at the Maharaja Organisation.

He and his wife Swarna have one son, Janaka. They live in Wellawatte, a beach-side suburb of Colombo.

References

External links

1940 births
Living people
All-Ceylon cricketers
Sri Lankan cricketers
Alumni of Royal College, Colombo
People from British Ceylon
Cricketers from Colombo